Mohini Bhasmasura is a 1966 Kannada language Indian Hindu mythological film directed by S. S. Verma and produced by T. Madaar and V.M.Kuppayya Chettiyar. The film stars Rajkumar, Leelavathi, Udaykumar and TN Balakrishna in the lead roles.The film has musical score by T. Chalapathi Rao. Vijaya Narasimha wrote both dialogues and songs for this movie.

Cast
 Rajkumar as Bhasmasura
 Leelavathi
 Uday Kumar as Shiva
 TN Balakrishna as Narada

References

External links
 

1960s Kannada-language films
Films based on the Bhagavata Purana